Sarah Lord Bailey (Lord; after first marriage, Bailey; after second marriage, Sanborn; September 9, 1856 – July 9, 1922) was a British-born American elocutionist and teacher of dramatic elocution.

Biography
Sarah Lord was born in Tottington, Metropolitan Borough of Bury, England, 9 September 1856. She was the only child of Mr. and Mrs. Daniel Lord, her parents bringing her to the U.S. the year following her birth and making their home in Lawrence, Massachusetts.

Early in life, she showed a fondness and talent for dramatic elocution, and it was developed by her participation in amateur plays given in Lawrence under the auspices of the Grand Army of the Republic posts. She was educated in the Oliver grammar school, and the Lasell Seminary (now Lasell University), Auburndale, Massachusetts, where she studied two years. She afterwards studied under the best teachers of elocution in Boston, and was graduated in 1888 from the Boston School of Oratory. She was a pupil of Howard M. Ticknor.

In Boston, August 23, 1877, she married Elbridge E. Bailey. In 1883, to benefit Mr. Bailey's health, they went to the Sandwich Islands where they lived for nearly two years. They were present at the coronation ceremonies of King Kalākaua and Queen Kapiʻolani in ʻIolani Palace, February 12, 1883.

In 1884, they returned to the U.S., and Mr. Bailey went into business in St. Louis, Missouri, where Mrs. Bailey taught elocution in the Missouri School for the Blind. They afterwards removed to Kansas City, Missouri where Mr. Bailey built up a flourishing business. For some time, Mrs. Bailey taught elocution and voice-culture in the Kansas City School of Elocution and Oratory.

She was obliged to return to Massachusetts on account of her failing health. In Lawrence, she conducted several large classes in elocution, besides fulfilling engagements to read in various cities.

In October 1891, she read at the Toronto Auditorium. In 1898, she published, Work and Art.

On May 11, 1901, she married Jack Sanborn.

Sarah Lord Bailey Sanborn died in Haverhill, Massachusetts, July 9, 1922 of stomach cancer.

Selected works

 Work and Art, 1898

References

External links
 
 

1856 births
1922 deaths
Wikipedia articles incorporating text from A Woman of the Century
People from Tottington, Greater Manchester
People from Lawrence, Massachusetts
Elocutionists
Educators from Massachusetts
19th-century American non-fiction writers
19th-century American women writers
Deaths from stomach cancer
Lasell College alumni